The year 1756 in architecture involved some significant events.

Events
Greek Revival architecture appears in the window design for Nuneham House in Oxfordshire, England, by Stiff Leadbetter.
John Smeaton produces the first high-quality cement using hydraulic lime since Roman times for construction of the third Eddystone Lighthouse (completed 1759).

Buildings and structures

Buildings

Replacement Catherine Palace, Tsarskoye Selo in Russia, designed by Francesco Bartolomeo Rastrelli, is completed.
Klov Palace, Kiev in Russia, probably designed by Gottfried Schädel and Pyotr Neyelov, is completed.
Replacement Basilica of the Birth of the Virgin Mary, Chełm in Poland, designed by Paweł Fontana, is completed.
Reconstruction of Abbot's Palace (Oliwa) in Gdańsk, Poland, is completed.
Newbridge, now Old Bridge, Pontypridd in Wales, designed by William Edwards, is completed.
St Andrew's in the Square, Glasgow, Scotland, designed by Allan Dreghorn, is completed.
Octagon Chapel, Norwich in England, designed by Thomas Ivory, is completed.
Original Whitefield's Tabernacle, Tottenham Court Road in London is built.
Trafford Hall in England is built.
Wrotham Park, Hertfordshire in England, designed by Isaac Ware, is completed.
Shaw Mansion (New London, Connecticut) is built.
The President's House (Princeton), New Jersey, is built.
First Presbyterian Church (Newburyport, Massachusetts) is built.
Alloways Creek Friends Meetinghouse, Hancock's Bridge, New Jersey, is built.
Saint Gevorg of Mughni Church, Tbilisi in Armenia is completely rebuilt.
St John the Evangelist Church, Shobdon, Herefordshire, England, is completely rebuilt with a "Strawberry Hill Gothic" interior. Elements of the previous building are incorporated in folly arches nearby.

Publications
Isaac Ware publishes A Complete Body of Architecture in London.

Births
February 29 – C. F. Hansen, Danish architect (d. 1845)
Chrystian Piotr Aigner, Polish architect (d. 1841)
Giovanni Antonio Antolini, Italian architect (d. 1841)
1756 or 1758 – Francesco Piranesi, Italian-born architectural engraver and architect (d. 1810)

Deaths
July 1 – Giambattista Nolli, Italian architect and surveyor (b. 1701)

References